Guttural R is the phenomenon whereby a rhotic consonant (an "R-like" sound) is produced in the back of the vocal tract (usually with the uvula) rather than in the front portion thereof and thus as a guttural consonant. Speakers of languages with guttural R typically regard guttural and coronal rhotics (throat-back-R and tongue-tip-R) to be alternative pronunciations of the same phoneme (conceptual sound), despite articulatory differences.

The guttural realization of a lone rhotic consonant is typical in most of what is now France, French-speaking Belgium, most of Germany, large parts of the Netherlands, Denmark, the southern parts of Sweden and southwestern parts of Norway; it is also frequent in Flanders, and among all French- and some German speakers in Switzerland and also in eastern Austria, including Vienna; as well as in Yiddish and hence Ashkenazi Hebrew. German speakers who use the frontal-R now mainly live in the Alps or close by.

Outside of central Europe, it also occurs as the normal pronunciation of one of two rhotic phonemes (usually replacing an older alveolar trill) in standard European Portuguese and in other parts of Portugal, particularly the Azores, various parts of Brazil, among minorities of other Portuguese-speaking regions, and in parts of Puerto Rico, Cuba and the Dominican Republic.

Romance languages

French

The r letter in French was historically pronounced as a trill, as was the case in Latin and as is still the case in Italian and Spanish. In Northern France, including Paris, the alveolar trill was gradually replaced with the uvular trill during the end of the 18th century. It has since evolved, in Paris, to a voiced uvular fricative or approximant .

The alveolar trill was still the common sound of r in Southern France and in Quebec at the beginning of the 20th century, having been gradually replaced since then, due to Parisian influence, by the uvular pronunciation. The alveolar trill is now mostly associated, even in Southern France and in Quebec, with older speakers and rural settings.

The alveolar trill is still used in French singing in classical choral and opera. It is also used in other French speaking countries as well as on French oversea territories such as French Polynesia due to the influence of other native languages which use the trill.

Portuguese

Standard versions of Portuguese have two rhotic phonemes, which contrast only between vowels. In older Portuguese, these were the alveolar flap  (written ) and the alveolar trill  (written ). In other positions, only  is written in Modern Portuguese, but it can stand for either sound, depending on the exact position. The distribution of these sounds is mostly the same as in other Iberian languages, i.e.:
Examples: carro, rua, honrar, Israel.
Examples: caro, quatro, quarto, mar.

In the 19th century, the uvular trill  penetrated the upper classes in the region of Lisbon in Portugal as the realization of the alveolar trill. By the 20th century, it had replaced the alveolar trill in most of the country's urban areas and started to give way to the voiced uvular fricative . Many northern dialects, like Transmontano, Portuese (which is heard in parts of Aveiro), Minhoto, and much of Beirão retain the alveolar trill. In the rural regions, the alveolar trill is still present, but because most of the country's population currently lives in or near the cities and owing to the mass media, the guttural  is now dominant in Portugal.

A common realization of the word-initial  in the Lisbon accent is a voiced uvular fricative trill .

The dialect of the fishermen of Setúbal used the voiced uvular fricative  for all instances of "r" – word start, intervocalic, postconsonantal and syllable ending. This same pronunciation is attested in people with rhotacism, in a new developing variety of young people in São Tomean Portuguese (Bouchard, 2017), and in non-native speakers of French or German origin.

In Africa, the classical alveolar trill is mostly still dominant, due to separate development from European Portuguese.

In many dialects, this voiceless sound not only replaces all occurrences of the traditional trill, but is also used for all  that is not followed by a vowel (i.e. when at the end of a syllable, which uses a flap in other dialects). The resulting distribution can be described as:
Examples: caro, quatro.
Examples: carro, rua, honrar, Israel, quarto, mar.

In the three southernmost states, however, the alveolar trill  remains frequent, and the distribution of trill and flap is as in Portugal. Some speakers use a guttural fricative instead of a trill, like the majority of Brazilians, but continue to use the flap  before consonants (e.g. in quarto) and between vowels (e.g. in caro). Among others, this includes many speakers in the city of São Paulo and some neighboring cities, though an alveolar approximant  is also common, not only in the city, but the approximant is the dominant articulation in the São Paulo state, outside the capital, the most populous state in Brazil. The caipira dialect has the alveolar approximant  in the same position.

In areas where  at the end of a word would be a voiceless fricative, the tendency in colloquial speech is to pronounce this sound very lightly, or omit it entirely.

Spanish
Generally the single flap , spelled r as in cara, undergoes no defective pronunciations, but the alveolar trill in rata or perro is one of the last sounds learned by children and uvularization is likely among individuals who fail to achieve the alveolar articulation. The popular name of the massacre comes from the shibboleth applied to distinguish Dominicans from Haitians: the suspects were ordered to name  some parsley.

In the Basque-speaking areas of Spain, the uvular articulation  has a higher prevalence among bilinguals than among Spanish monolinguals.

Italian

Occitan
As with all other Romance languages, the alveolar trill  is the original way to pronounce the letter r in Occitan, as it was in Latin. Nowadays, the uvular trill  and the Voiced uvular fricative or approximant  are common in some Occitan dialects (Provence, Auvergne, Alps, Limousin). The dialects of Languedoc and Gascony also have these realizations, but it is generally considered to be influence from French and therefore rejected from the standard versions of these dialects.

Breton

Breton, spoken in Brittany (France), is a Celtic rather than Romance language, but is heavily influenced by French. It retains an alveolar trill in some dialects, like in Léon and Morbihan, but most dialects now have the same rhotic as French, .

Continental West Germanic

The uvular rhotic is most common in Central German dialects and in Standard German. Many Low Franconian, Low Saxon, and Upper German varieties have also adopted it with others maintaining the alveolar trill. The development of uvular rhotics in these regions is not entirely understood, but a common theory is that these languages have done so because of French influence, though the reason for uvular rhotics in modern European French itself is not well understood (see above).

The Frisian languages usually retain an alveolar rhotic.

Dutch and Afrikaans

In modern Dutch, quite a few different rhotic sounds are used. In Flanders, the usual rhotic is an alveolar trill, but the uvular rhotic  does occur, mostly in the province of Limburg, in Ghent and in Brussels. In the Netherlands, the uvular rhotic is the dominant rhotic in the southern provinces of North Brabant and Limburg, having become so in the early twentieth century. In the rest of the country, the situation is more complicated. The uvular rhotic is dominant in the western agglomeration Randstad, including cities like Rotterdam, The Hague and Utrecht (the dialect of Amsterdam conversely tends to use an alveolar rhotic, but the uvular is becoming increasingly common). The uvular rhotic is also used in some major cities such as Leeuwarden (Stadsfries). Outside of these uvular rhotic core areas, the alveolar trill is common. People learning Dutch as a foreign language also tend to use the alveolar trill because it contrasts better with the voiceless velar fricative  in Dutch. The Afrikaans language of South Africa also uses an alveolar trill for its rhotic, except in the non-urban rural regions around Cape Town, chiefly in the town of Malmesbury, Western Cape, where it is uvular (called a bry). Some Afrikaans speakers from other areas also bry, either as a result of ancestry from the Malmesbury region or from difficulty pronouncing the alveolar trill.

Low Saxon
In the Dutch Low Saxon area there are several cities which have the uvular rhotic: Steenwijk, Kampen, Zwolle and Deventer. In IJsselmuiden near Kampen the uvular r can also be heard. In the countryside the alveolar trill is common.

Standard German

Although the first standardized pronunciation dictionary by Theodor Siebs prescribed an alveolar pronunciation, most varieties of Standard German are now spoken with a uvular rhotic, usually a fricative or approximant , rather than a trill . The alveolar pronunciation  continues to be used in some Standard German varieties, now especially in the south of German-speaking Europe. It also remains common in classical singing and, to a lesser degree, in stage acting (see ).

In German dialects, the alveolar has survived somewhat more widely than in the standard language, though there are several regions, especially in Central German, where even the broadest rural dialects use a uvular R. 

This is most common in the syllable coda, as in non-rhotic English, but sometimes occurs before an underlying schwa, too. Vocalization of "r" is rare only in Alemannic and Swabian German.

Yiddish

Yiddish, the traditional language of Ashkenazi Jews in central and eastern Europe, is derived from Middle High German. As such it presumably used the alveolar R at first, but the uvular R then became predominant in many Yiddish dialects. It is unclear whether this happened through independent developments or under influence from modern German (a language widely spoken in large parts of eastern Europe until 1945).

Insular West Germanic

English

Speakers of the traditional English dialect of Northumberland and northern County Durham use a uvular rhotic, known as the "Northumbrian Burr".Survey of English Dialects, Heddon-on-the-Wall, Northumberland However, it is no longer used by most contemporary speakers, who generally realize  as an alveolar approximant, in common with other varieties spoken in the English-speaking world.Millennium Memory Bank, Butterknowle, County Durham

The Hiberno-English of northeastern Leinster in Ireland also uses a uvular .

North Germanic
Alveolar rhotics predominate in northern Scandinavia. Thus the Norwegian word "norsk" is pronounced  by speakers with an alveolar flap. This effect is rare in the speech of those using a uvular R.

Danish and Swedish
The rhotic used in Denmark is a voiced uvular approximant, and the nearby Swedish ex-Danish regions of Scania, Blekinge, southern Halland as well as a large part of Småland and on the Öland island, use a uvular trill or a uvular fricative.

The pronunciation remains if a word that is pronounced with a particular rhotic consonant is put into a compound word in a position where that realization would not otherwise occur if it were part of the same stem as the preceding sound. However, in Östergötland the pronunciation tends to gravitate more towards  and in Västergötland the realization is commonly voiced.
Common from the time of Gustav III (Swedish king 1771–1792), who was much inspired by French culture and language, was the use of guttural R in the nobility and in the upper classes of Stockholm. This phenomenon vanished in the 1900s. The last well-known non-Southerner who spoke with a guttural R, and did not have a speech defect, was Anders Gernandt, a popular equitation commentator on TV.

Norwegian
Most of Norway uses an alveolar flap, but about one third of the inhabitants of Norway, primarily in the South-West region, are now using the uvular rhotic. In the western and southern part of South Norway, the uvular rhotic is still spreading and includes all towns and coastal areas of Agder, most of Rogaland, large parts of Hordaland, and Sogn og Fjordane in and around Florø. The origin was the city of Bergen as well as Kristiansand in the 18th century.

Icelandic

Slavic languages

In Slavic languages, the alveolar trill predominates, with the use of guttural rhotics seen as defective pronunciation. However, the uvular trill is common among the languages of the Sorbian minority in Saxony, eastern Germany, likely due to German influence. The uvular rhotic may also be found in a small minority in Silesia and other German-influenced regions of Poland and also Slovenia, but is overall quite rare even in these regions. It can also be perceived as an ethnic marker of Jewishness, particularly in Russian where Eastern European Jews often carried the uvular rhotic from their native Yiddish into their pronunciation of Russian.

Semitic languages

Hebrew
In Hebrew, the consonant Gimel without a dagesh was associated with the Guttural R.

In Hebrew, the classical pronunciation associated with the consonant  was flapped , and was grammatically treated as an ungeminable phoneme of the language. In most dialects of Hebrew among the Jewish diaspora, it remained a flap  or a trill . However, in some Ashkenazi dialects as preserved among Jews in northern Europe it was a uvular rhotic, either a trill  or a fricative . This was because many (but not all) native dialects of Yiddish were spoken that way, and their liturgical Hebrew carried the same pronunciation. Some Iraqi Jews also pronounce  as a guttural , reflecting their dialect of Arabic.

An apparently unrelated uvular rhotic is believed to have appeared in the Tiberian vocalization of Hebrew, where it is believed to have coexisted with additional non-guttural, emphatic articulations of  depending on circumstances.

Yiddish influence
Although an Ashkenazi Jew in the Russian Empire, the Zionist Eliezer Ben-Yehuda based his Standard Hebrew on Sephardi Hebrew, originally spoken in Spain, and therefore recommended an alveolar . However, just like him, the first waves of Jews to resettle in the Holy Land were Ashkenazi, and Standard Hebrew would come to be spoken with their native pronunciation. Consequently, by now nearly all Israeli Jews pronounce the consonant rêš as a uvular approximant , specifically , which also exists in Yiddish.

The alveolar rhotic is still used today in some formal speech, such as radio news broadcasts, and in the past was widely used in television and singing.

Sephardic Hebrew

Many Jewish immigrants to Israel spoke a variety of Arabic in their countries of origin and pronounced the Hebrew rhotic as an alveolar flap , similar to Arabic . Gradually, many of them began pronouncing their Hebrew rhotic as a voiced uvular fricative , a sound similar or (depending on the Arabic dialect) identical to Arabic . However, in modern Sephardic and Mizrahi poetry and folk music an alveolar rhotic continues to be used.

Arabic

These include:

 pre-modern Baghdadi Arabic.
 The Tigris dialects, a group among the Mesopotamian Arabic in Iraq, for instance in Mosul
 The Jewish and Christian dialects in Baghdad
 The Jewish dialect in Algiers
 The dialect of Jijel in Algeria
 Some Muslim-urban dialects of Morocco (e.g. in Fes)
 Some Jewish dialects in Morocco.

The uvular  was attested already in vernacular Arabic of the Abbasid period. Nowadays Christian Arabic of Baghdad exhibits also an alveolar trill in very few lexemes, but primarily used in loanwords from Modern Standard Arabic. Native words with an alveolar trill are rare. Moreover, Mosul Arabic commonly has the voiced alveolar trill instead of a uvular fricative in numbers (e.g.  "forty"). Although this guttural rhotic is rare in Arabic, uvular and velar sounds are common in this language. The uvular or velar fricative ~ is a common standard pronunciation of the letter , and the uvular plosive  is a standard pronunciation of the letter .

Ethiopic

But there are also assertions that around Addis Abeba some dialects exhibit a uvular r. Note that this information is not very well supported among Semitists. Also in Gafat (extinct since the 1950s) a uvular fricative or trill might have existed.

Akkadian

The majority of Assyriologists deem an alveolar trill or flap the most likely pronunciation of Akkadian  in most dialects. However, there are several indications toward a velar or uvular fricative ~ particularly supported by John Huehnergard. The main arguments constitute alternations with the voiceless uvular fricative  (e.g. ruššû/ḫuššû "red"; barmātu "multicolored" (fem. pl.), the spelling ba-aḫ-ma-a-tù is attested).

Austronesian

Malayan languages
Guttural R exists among several Malay dialects. While standard Malay commonly uses coronal r, the guttural fricative (~) are more prominently used in many dialects in Peninsular Malaysia and East Malaysia as well as some parts of Sumatra and East Kalimantan. These dialects include:

 Pahang Malay
 Kedah Malay
 Kelantan-Pattani Malay
 Negeri Sembilan Malay
 Sarawak Malay
 Terengganu Malay
 Perak Malay
 Tamiang Malay
 Pontianak Malay
 Palembang Malay

~ Perak Malay and Kedah Malay are the most notable examples.

These dialects mainly use the guttural fricative (~) for both /r/ and /gh/. Standard Malay includes both coronal r and voiced guttural fricative /gh/ (~) as two different phonemes. To denote the guttural r in the dialects, the letter "r" is often replaced by "gh" or "q" in informal writing . Standard Malay words with voiced velar fricative, such as loghat (dialect) and ghaib (invisible, mystical) are mostly Arabic loanwords spelled in their origin language with the letter  in the Jawi alphabet.

Other Austronesian languages
Other Austronesian languages with similar features are:

 Acehnese
 Alas-Kluet
 Cham
 Minangkabau (closely related to Malay that it might be dialects of the same language)
 Lampung
 Piuma
 Sapediq
 Rinaxekerek
 Sinvaudjan

Other language families

Basque
In the Southern Basque Country, the uvular articulation is seen as a speech defect, but the prevalence is higher among bilinguals than among Spanish monolinguals. Recently, speakers of Lapurdian and Low Navarrese are uvularizing the tap (-r-'') as well, thus neutralizing both rhotics.

Khmer

Bantu
Sesotho originally used an alveolar trill , which has shifted to uvular  in modern times.

Hill-Maṛia
Hill-Maṛia (sometimes considered a dialect of Gondi) has a /ʁ/ corresponding to /r/ in other realated languages or *t̠ from proto Dravidian.

Rhotic-agnostic guttural consonants written as rhotics
There are languages where certain indigenous guttural consonants came to be written with symbols used in other languages to represent rhotics, thereby giving the superficial appearance of a guttural R without actually functioning as true rhotic consonants.

Inuit languages

See also
 R
 Glottal consonant
 Uvular consonant
 Rhotic consonant

References

Notes

Works cited

External links 
 Unicode reference for IPA
 Article on the pronunciation of R in French

Consonants
Phonetics
Phonology